Saint Remigius may refer to:

 Saint Remigius of Reims (born c. 437 – 533), bishop of Reims and Apostle of the Franks,
 Saint Remigius of Rouen (born c. 727 – 772), archbishop of Rouen,
 Saint Remigius of Strasbourg (died 20 March 783), bishop of Strasbourg,
 Saint Remigius of Lyon (died 28 October 875), archbishop of Lyon,
 Saint Remigius de Fécamp of Lincoln (died 7 May 1092), bishop of Lincoln,
 Saint Remigius Isoré (1852- 1900), priest and martyr during Boxer Rebellion.